Garu - Tempane is one of the constituencies represented in the Parliament of Ghana. It elects one Member of Parliament (MP) by the first past the post system of election. Garu - Tempane is located in the Garu-Tempane district  of the Upper East Region of Ghana.

Boundaries
The seat is located within the Garu-Tempane District in the Upper East Region of Ghana. The constituency was divided to form the Garu and Tempane constituencies respectively in 2012.

Members of Parliament

Elections

See also
List of Ghana Parliament constituencies

References 

Parliamentary constituencies in the Upper East Region